Eforie may refer to:

 Eforie, town and a holiday resort on the Black Sea shore, in Constanţa County, Romania
 Eforie Sud is a village, part of the Eforie town in Constanţa County, Romania
 Eforie Nord is a village, part of the Eforie town in Constanţa County, Romania